"Got to Get You into My Life" is a song by the English rock band the Beatles, first released in 1966 on their album Revolver. It was written by Paul McCartney and credited to Lennon–McCartney. The song is a homage to the Motown Sound, with colourful brass instrumentation and lyrics that suggest a psychedelic experience. "It's actually an ode to pot," McCartney explained. A cover version by Cliff Bennett and the Rebel Rousers, produced by McCartney, peaked at number six in 1966 in the UK. The song was issued in the United States as a single from the Rock 'n' Roll Music compilation album in 1976, six years after the Beatles disbanded. Another cover version by Earth, Wind & Fire from the Sgt. Pepper's Lonely Hearts Club Band film soundtrack peaked at number nine in the US in 1978.

Composition and recording
Though officially credited to Lennon–McCartney, McCartney was primarily responsible for the writing of the song, to which he also contributed lead vocals. It was recorded at Abbey Road Studios between 7 April and 17 June 1966 and evolved considerably between the first takes and the final version released on album. The song seems to have been hard to arrange until the soul-style horns, strongly reminiscent of the Stax' Memphis soul and Motown sound, were introduced. The original version of the track, taped on the second day of the Revolver sessions, featured an arrangement that included harmonium and acoustic guitar, and a partly a-cappella section (repeating the words "I need your love") sung by McCartney, John Lennon and George Harrison. In the description of author Robert Rodriguez, relative to the "R&B-styled shouter" that the band completed in June, this version was "more Haight-Ashbury than Memphis". Author Devin McKinney similarly views the early take as "radiat[ing] peace in a hippie vein", and he recognises the arrangement as a forerunner to the sound adopted by the Beach Boys over 1967–1968 on their albums Smiley Smile and Wild Honey.

The brass was close-miked in the bells of the instruments, then put through a limiter. This session, on 18 May, marked the first time that the Beatles had used a horn section.

The song starts with a blaring brass fanfare, McCartney's vocals entering at 0:07. The chorus of the song appears at 1:04, with the song's title sung. The song then switches between a verse and the refrain. A short electric guitar solo appears at 1:53 and at 2:10 the horn fanfare re-enters. The song closes with fading vocals of McCartney.

In Barry Miles' 1997 book Paul McCartney: Many Years from Now, McCartney disclosed that the song was about marijuana. "'Got to Get You into My Life' was one I wrote when I had first been introduced to pot ... So [it's] really a song about that, it's not to a person." Many lyrics from the song suggest this: "I took a ride, I didn't know what I would find there / Another road where maybe I could see some other kind of mind there.",'"What can I do? What can I be? When I'm with you, I want to stay there / If I am true, I will never leave and if I do, I'll know the way there." "It's actually an ode to pot," McCartney explained, "like someone else might write an ode to chocolate or a good claret."

Release and reception
Parlophone released Revolver on 5 August 1966 with "Got to Get You into My Life" sequenced as the penultimate track, between Harrison's "I Want to Tell You" and Lennon's "Tomorrow Never Knows". According to Devin McKinney, while McCartney's songs can be heard individually as "simple affirmations", in the context of their placement on Revolver, "each song gains" from the reflected depth of the Lennon and Harrison compositions. McKinney writes that "Got to Get You into My Life" "is notable for being as expressive of a simple livid frustration as any McCartney music to date: its two minutes are a tight mass of constipated fury, an existential annoyance expressing itself as romantic confusion".

In his review of the song for AllMusic, Thomas Ward writes: "McCartney's always been a great vocalist, and this is perhaps the best example of his singing on Revolver. One of the overlooked gems on the album." Scott Plagenhoef of Pitchfork considers Revolver to be McCartney's "maturation record" as a songwriter in the same way that Rubber Soul had been for Lennon in 1965. He highlights "Got to Get You into My Life" as one of McCartney's "most demonstrative songs" on the album and a reflection of his innate "optimism and populism". Chris Coplan of Consequence of Sound admires the psychedelic tone of Revolver, but says that this experimentalism renders the more standard pop songs, such as "Got to Get You into My Life" and "Here, There and Everywhere", "seemingly out of place" within the collection.

Musicologist Walter Everett describes "Got to Get You into My Life" as "always... one of the LP's most popular tracks" due to the success of its cover recordings, the first of which was a 1966 UK top-ten hit by Cliff Bennett and the Rebel Rousers, co-produced by McCartney, and the 1976 single release of the Beatles' original. Music critic Tim Riley says the song is the "most derivative cut" on Revolver but nevertheless identifies it as an authentic rhythm and blues track that shows how well the Beatles had mastered the style. Riley especially praises the song's closing section, introduced by a Harrison guitar break that he describes as "dazzling" in sound and a combination of "crimped energy" and "tasty ornaments", followed by McCartney's vocal interplay with the brass.

When asked about the song in his 1980 Playboy interview, Lennon said, "Paul's again. I think that was one of his best songs, too."

Charts

Weekly charts

Year-end charts

Certifications

Personnel
According to Ian MacDonald:

The Beatles
Paul McCartney – double-tracked lead vocal, bass
John Lennon – rhythm guitar (although MacDonald was unsure if Lennon played the rhythm guitar part)
George Harrison – lead guitar
Ringo Starr – drums, tambourine

Additional musicians
George Martin – organ, producer
Eddie Thornton – trumpet
Ian Hamer – trumpet
Les Condon – trumpet
Alan Branscombe – tenor saxophone
Peter Coe – tenor saxophone

Earth, Wind & Fire version

A cover version by Earth, Wind & Fire was issued as a single in July 1978 by Columbia Records.  Their rendition reached No. 1 on the Billboard Hot Soul Singles chart and No. 9 on the Billboard Hot 100. The song also rose to No. 33 on the UK Singles chart. "Got to Get You into My Life" has also been certified Gold in the US by the RIAA.

Critical reception
The New York Daily News described Earth, Wind & Fire's version of "Got To Get You into My Life" as "oh-so-cool". Allmusic noted the tune as "a great remake". Cashbox also called EWF's cover of the song an "innovative rendition". Treble website placed this version as number thirty-four of "the top 100 cover songs". Record World said that "Maurice White's signature vocal and instrumental arrangements give extra life to the disc."
 
"Got to Get You into My Life" won a Grammy Award for Best Instrumental Arrangement Accompanying Vocalist(s). The song was also nominated for a Best Pop Performance by a Duo or Group with Vocals.

Chart performance

Certifications

Other cover versions
Cliff Bennett and the Rebel Rousers in 1966 (UK chart No. 6), produced by Paul McCartney and released the same day as Revolver.
Blood, Sweat, and Tears released the song on their 1975 album New City, with the single reaching no. 62 in the US.
Daniel Johnston released the song on his album 1990.

Notes

References

External links

 
 

The Beatles songs
1966 songs
1966 singles
1976 singles
1978 singles
British soul songs
RPM Top Singles number-one singles
Earth, Wind & Fire songs
Song recordings produced by George Martin
Songs written by Lennon–McCartney
Songs about cannabis
Capitol Records singles
Columbia Records singles
Parlophone singles
Songs published by Northern Songs
Grammy Award for Best Instrumental Arrangement Accompanying Vocalist(s)